Chaenostoma may refer to:
 Chaenostoma (crab), a genus of crabs in the family Macrophthalmidae
 Chaenostoma (plant), a genus of flowering plants in the family Scrophulariaceae